is the seventh installment of Toei Company's Super Sentai metaseries. It aired on TV Asahi from February 5, 1983, to January 28, 1984, replacing Dai Sentai Goggle-V and was replaced by Choudenshi Bioman with a total of 51 episodes. The international English title is listed by Toei as simply Dynaman.

Yutaka Izubuchi designed the villains of the series. This was his first time designing Super Sentai suits and costumes; he would later be recruited again to design the suits for Super Sentai consecutively until 1986's Choushinsei Flashman and would return as character designer for Tokumei Sentai Go-Busters.

Plot
The Jashinka Empire rises from the depths of the Earth to conquer the world. To stop them, Dr. Kyutaro Yumeno assembles five inventors to his laboratory, Yumeno Invention Laboratory and gives them the power to become Dynamen. Each member has their own goal, but as the Kagaku Sentai Dynaman, they are united to stop the Jashinka Empire in their tracks.

Characters

Yumeno Invention Center
The Yumeno Invention Center is a children's playground, which actually acts as a front for the Dynastation.

Dynaman

The Dynaman are the Super Sentai team assembled by Kyutaro Yumeno to combat the Janshinka Empire. They're also the first group in the franchise to have their costumes made out of spandex and they discontinued the use of capes and scarves, which were part of Super Sentai uniforms from Himitsu Sentai Gorenger to Dai Sentai Goggle-V.

 /: A kendō master from Hokkaido. Responsible and headstrong, he lost his mother when he was young and sympathizes with children who also suffered the loss of a parent. The master of all martial arts, he is a rank holder in kendo, karate, judo, and boxing. He is also a champion motorcyclist. As an inventor, Hokuto's dream is to create an engine that does not cause pollution.
Weapons: 
Attacks: 
Dyna Rod Attack: 
 /: A descendant of Iga ninjas, he is skilled at the art of ninpou and invisibility and he never allows himself to miss a day of training. Comedic and cheerful, children take a liking to him. As an astronomer, he dreams of contacting and befriending alien life-forms.
Weapons: , 
Dyna Rod Attack: 
 /: He is from Ishigaki Island. A swimmer and surfer who dreams of inventing artificial gills to allow people to breathe underwater and enjoy waterlife in all of its glory. He has extensive knowledge of sealife. He despises losing, always wanting to make up for failures he is responsible for. His exclusive vehicles are the Surf Jet and the Attack Board. 
Attacks: , 
Dyna Rod Attack: 
 /: A nature lover from Kyushu who dreams to improve plant and farm breeds, aiming to develop new foods and flowers. Although he plays the clown, deep down he is a tender and serious man.
Weapons: 
Dyna Rod Attack: 
 /: She dreams of inventing a machine in order to understand and communicate with animals despite her fear of cats. A skilled fencer, Rei dislikes fighting, but fights for the sake of protecting everyone's dream and the safety of the world.
Weapons: , 
Attacks: 
Dyna Rod Attack:

Arsenal
: The transformation device of the team. To transform, the team either calls their name by themselves or the team name together.
: The sidearm of the team. It fires an attack specific to their respective Dynaman.
: When a Dynaman flexes their arms, their biceps enlarge, allowing them to deliver a powerful punch.

Team Attacks
: The finishing move of the team. They jump into the air, become a ball of light and fly into the enemy.
: An upgraded version of Super Dynamite.
: The rockets on their boots that make them run faster.
: The team delivers consecutive kicks.
: The Dyna Rods are put together and flash.
: The team fires their Dyna Rods together.

Vehicles
: The motorcycle of Dyna Red.
: A truck for the rest of the team.
: A surfboard type vehicle that Dyna Blue uses.
: The flying fortress that stores the mecha components of the Dyna Robo.

Mecha
: The giant robot that is formed by the command .
: The mecha of Dyna Red. It is stored in the top dome of the Dy Jupiter. It shoots arrowhead-shaped lasers. It forms the head of the Dyna Robo.
: The mecha of Dyna Black and Dyna Blue. It is stored in the middle component of the Dy Jupiter, beneath the Dyna Mach, and uses the door for Dyna Garry's compartment as a ramp. It shoots missiles (Episode 43). It forms the body of the Dyna Robo.
: The mecha of Dyna Yellow and Dyna Pink. It is stored in the lowermost compartment of the Dy Jupiter, beneath the Dyna Mobile. It forms the legs of the Dyna Robo.

Allies
 : The head of the Yumeno Invention Center and founder of the Kagaku Sentai. Detected abnormalities in volcanic regions for years before discovering the existence of the Jashinka, creating the Kagaku Sentai in order to oppose them. While in the Yumeno Center, he puts on a cheerful face, immediately turning all business and no-nonsense when dealing in Dyna Station. His real name is Professor Toyama, who 15 years prior discovered the "'Retro Gene" that increases cells. He changed his name and went into hiding when the woman dearest to him was killed by a Jashinka spy who was aiming for his discovery, therefore dedicating his life to discovering the threat and opposing them with the Kagaku Sentai. His dream is to inspire the dream of others.
Age: 44 years old
 Kendo Robo: The mascot of the Yumeno Invention Center invented by Doctor Yumeno. It was destroyed with the center in episode 37.

Tailed-People Clan Jashinka Empire
The  are evolved from a race of reptiles. They arrived at Earth in ancient times, the life-forms being carried along with a meteorite, crashing into the earth, and falling deep into its core. As time went on, the life-forms evolved, becoming the civilized Tailed-People Clan. The Tailed-People are a civilization of advanced science (higher than human's), with the rank of their civilization being determined by the number of tails. Believing Earth to be theirs, for their civilization to rise, they begin invasion. Originally planning to turn humans into their own kind, the experiment failed, and their strategy was changed to simply destroying mankind by reducing the number of human beings as the Tailed-People Clan was outnumbered. Being as the number of tails determines rank, the Emperor's dream is to obtain ten tails, who is said to provide one with eternal life and powers. Their rank and status is determined by the number of tails each member has. The more tails, the greater the status.
: The ringleader who orders the invasion and building of the Jashinka Empire above. With nine tails, he believes in the legend and dreams of obtaining the tenth tail that will provide eternal life and super powers, which he believes he will obtain once he's conquered humans. His cruelty unmatched, he originally shows protection of his son, Megiddo, until one failure too many. He is armed with ESP abilities and the Emperor Sword. Killed by his own son after a long duel but not before giving Princess Chimera the Emperor Sword to make Megiddo Emperor.
: The Seven-tailed "God of War," Kar is the second in command who developed the Jashinka Beast manufacturing machine Progressor. Extremely loyal to Aton, he is later set-up by General Zenobia and Dark Knight, forcing him to challenge Dynaman to a fight to prove his innocence and loyalty and dies as a result.
: The son of Aton. He originally had five tails until he lost one during his first fight with Dyna Red, becoming a disgrace to his clan and developing a grudge towards Dyna Red. But due to prideful arrogance and temper, he continuously fails. In Episode 38, after being prosecuted by Zenobia, his remaining tails are cut off and he's exiled into the Millennium Cave prison by his own father. Swearing revenge, he breaks free from the prison, becoming , wielder of the "Dance of Darkness" technique. As Dark Knight, he is not only an enemy of Dynaman, but of Jashinka, as well. Calling himself "the messenger of darkness", he first lets his presence known by stealing Aton's Emperor Sword (Episode 44). He shows most hatred for General Zenobia and Dyna Red. He was given the title of Emperor by his father after his mask of Dark Knight was destroyed by Dyna Red and he dueled his father as Dark Knight. He was called . He died when his ship crashed into the ground.
: The bodyguards of Megiddo. The tail soldiers is distinguished by their clothing and berets. They were eaten by a monster plant that was harvested by Butterfly Shinka.
: The witch niece of Aton, cousin of Megiddo. She has a short, round tail of four. She respects Aton and is a master in illusions and psychokinesis. She is excellent at strategies to fool humans by using disguises and charm. She is Rei / Dyna Pink's rival. As prideful as her cousin Megiddo, the two constantly bicker. She died alongside Meggido.
: A new general with seven tails who appears in episode 37. She destroyed the Invention Center. A combat expert with seven tails, she too holds the title of general. Also a priestess who deals in ritual. Eight years ago, she tried to assassinate Aton and take the throne for herself. While conspirators were executed, Aton chose to banish Zenobia to imprisonment in the Millennium Cave out of fear of her witchcraft knowledge. After escaping from it, she swears loyalty to Aton, fighting Dynaman while secretly planning to overthrowing him and develop her own tenth tail. Spied on by Megiddo, she sets him up by having him banished to the Millennium Cave, masking it as a contempt for failure. She discovers the Retro Gene, attempting to use it in growing the tenth tail. When she does grow a tenth tail, she dies afterwards.
: The foot soldiers of the empire. They are humanoid lizards with red eyes, green and black skin and one tail. They are fully capable of speech, as demonstrated after Megiddo loses a tail in his first fight with Dyna Red.
: A mobile fortress shaped like a flying fish armed with four rocket launchers in each side of its hull.
: Small fighters launched from the Gran Gizmo.

Episodes

Cast
 Hokuto Dan: Satoshi Okita
 Ryu Hoshikawa: Junichi Haruta
 Yosuke Shima: Koji Unogi
 Kosaku Nango: Yu Tokita
 Rei Tachibana: Sayoko Hagiwara
 Dr. Kyutaro Yumeno: Junji Shimada
 Prince Megiddo: Takeki Hayashi
 General Kar: Masashi Ishibashi
 Princess Chimera: Mari Kouno
 General Zenobia: Ritsuko Fujiyama
 Emperor Aton: Takeshi Watabe (voice)
 Dark Knight: Michirou Iida (voice)

Crew
Directed by
Shohei Tojo, Minoru Yamada, Kazushi Hattori, Nagafumi Hori
Story and Screenplay by
Hirohisa Soda, Kousuke Miki, Kyoko Sagiyama, Kenji Terada, Isao Matsumoto, Ichirou Yamanaka, Shu Yoshida
Action Director
Junji Yamaoka

Songs
Opening theme

Lyrics: Kazuo Koike
Composition & Arrangement: 
Artist: MoJo, (Chorus) Koorogi '73

Ending theme

Lyrics: Kazuo Koike
Composition & Arrangement: Kensuke Kyō
Artist: MoJo

International Broadcasts
The first six episodes of the series were shown in the United States on the USA Network's Night Flight and alternately Nickelodeon's Special Delivery throughout 1987-1988 as a dubbed parody, simply titled Dynaman.  As of 2023, It is currently available on the online streaming services Night Flight Plus and VRV.

Appearances in Power Rangers
The Dynaman team appeared in Power Rangers Megaforce as the Battalion Rangers.

References

External links
 Official Kagaku Sentai Dynaman website 

Super Sentai
1983 Japanese television series debuts
1984 Japanese television series endings
Parodies of television shows
TV Asahi original programming
1980s Japanese television series
Works about legendary creatures